Achille Ouy (18891959) was a French philosopher and sociologist.

Ouy taught philosophy at various lycees, and was involved with the Mercure de France. "A follower of René Worms and Gaston Richard, Ouy "performed many day-to-day tasks that held the R.I.S. and IIS together from 1919 to 1940."

Works
 'Paracelse, sa vie et son oeuvre', Revue internationale de sociologie, Vol. 27, Paris, 1919.
 Cahier d'études philosophiques, 1924
 'Paul Szende', Revue Internationale de Sociologie, 1925, p. 79
 'Nicholas Petrescu: The Principles of Comparative Sociology', Revue Internationale de Sociologie, Vol. 30, No. 5–6, 1925.
 'René Worms (1869-1926)', Revue internationale de sociologie, Vol. 33 (1925), p. 577-580.
 Georges Duhamel, l'homme et l'ceuvre. Les ecrivains reunis, 1927.
 'La méthode sociologique de Durkheim', Revue Internationale de Sociologie, Vol. 35 (1927), pp. 371–383
 Deux études d'esthétique sociologique, 1932
 'Le scandale et la faute', Revue de Métaphysique et de Morale, Vol. 42, No. 1(1935), pp. 107–115
 'Les sociologues et la sociologie', R. I. S., Vol. 47 (1939), pp. 245–75
 La Philosophie secrète des alchimistes, Ou le Secret de l'or des philosophes, 1942

Further reading
 Achille Ouy, Revue Internationale de Sociologie, 1925, pp. 79–82

References

1889 births
1959 deaths
French sociologists
20th-century French philosophers